Dalas Santavy is a Canadian weightlifter Head coach for the 2020 Canadian Tokyo Olympic Team .  He represented Canada at the 1998 Commonwealth Games in Kuala Lumpur, Malaysia and the 2006 Commonwealth Games in Melbourne, Australia in the weightlifting competitions.  He also competed at the 2007 Pan American Games in Rio de Janeiro, Brazil. Santavy retained the Canadian Senior Weightlifting Championship title for the fifth time on June 3, 2012 at the Canadian Senior Championship in La Prairie, Quebec. His total lift at the championship was 168 kg.

Major results

References

Boilermakers
Living people
Canadian male weightlifters
1972 births
Weightlifters at the 1998 Commonwealth Games
Weightlifters at the 2006 Commonwealth Games
Commonwealth Games competitors for Canada
Weightlifters at the 2007 Pan American Games
Pan American Games competitors for Canada
20th-century Canadian people
21st-century Canadian people